Eastern culture is the heritage of social norms, ethical values, traditional customs, belief systems, political systems, artifacts and technologies that originated in or are associated with the Eastern world. 

Eastern culture may also refer to:

 The Eastern world, including:
 The Far East
 The Near East
 The Culture of Asia
 Eastern philosophy

See also 
 Orient